Hard Feelings (also known as Hang Tough) is a 1982 Canadian drama film directed by Daryl Duke.

Overview
In 1963, Barnie Margruder is a teenager dealing with school bullies, fighting parents, conflicting feelings about sex, and a bad relationship with his girlfriend. His life changes when he befriends with Winona, an African-American girl from the other side of the tracks who gives him a new perspective on his hometown and the world.

Cast
Carl Marotte as Barnie Margruder
Charlayne Woodard as Winona Lockhart
Grand Bush as Latham Lockhart
Vincent Bufano as Russell Linwood
Allan Katz as Les Bridgeman
Lisa Langlois as Barbara Holland
Sylvia Llewellyn as Mrs. Joan Margruder
Micheal Donaghue as Mr. Fred Margruder
Stephanie Miller as Leslie Wolstein

References

External links

1982 films
1980s coming-of-age drama films
Canadian coming-of-age drama films
English-language Canadian films
Films directed by Daryl Duke
Films with screenplays by W. D. Richter
Films set in 1963
Films about bullying
Films about dysfunctional families
1982 drama films
1980s English-language films
1980s Canadian films
English-language drama films